Simulium latipes  is a species of fly in the family Simuliidae. It is found in the  Palearctic .

References

Simulium
Insects described in 1804
Nematoceran flies of Europe